The 2016 NRL season was the 109th season of professional rugby league in Australia and the 19th season run by the National Rugby League. The season started in New Zealand with the annual Auckland Nines, and was followed by the All Stars Match, which was played at Suncorp Stadium in Brisbane, and the World Club Series. The season concluded on October 2 with the Cronulla-Sutherland Sharks winning their first ever premiership after 50 seasons, having entered the competition in 1967. The season was also noteworthy as it was the first time that all three Queensland based teams made the finals.

Teams

The lineup of teams remained unchanged for the 10th consecutive year. The NRL's salary cap for the clubs' top 25 players was $A6.3M for 2016.

Pre-season

The 2016 pre-season featured the third edition of the Auckland Nines competition, held over a weekend at Auckland's Eden Park in which the Parramatta Eels defeated the New Zealand Warriors in the final. The All Stars match was held on February 13 at Suncorp Stadium in Brisbane. The 2016 World Club Series took place in England with the NRL premiers North Queensland Cowboys defeating the Super League champions Leeds Rhinos in the World Club Challenge match.

Parramatta Eels salary cap breach

The Parramatta Eels were faced with starting the season on -4 points due to salary cap indiscretions in 2015, however the NRL was satisfied with governance changes at the Eels and no points were deducted.

However, on 3 May 2016, after further salary cap breaches were exposed by the NRL, CEO Todd Greenberg announced the preliminary penalties of the club being fined $1 million, deducted twelve competition points, stripped of its 2016 Auckland Nines title and they were barred from receiving any further competition points until they fell under the salary cap, which they were reported to have exceeded by $570,000. Five officials (chairman Steve Sharp, deputy chairman Tom Issa, director Peter Serrao, chief executive John Boulous and football manager Daniel Anderson) were also suspended indefinitely. On 12 May the NRL reported that Parramatta had fallen back under the salary cap for 2016 and were able to play for competition points again for their next scheduled game.

On 9 July, after over 2 months of club officials contesting the preliminary penalties, Parramatta were handed their punishment with the addition of their for/against points tally accumulated from rounds 1-9 being deducted.

Regular season

Bold – Opposition's Home game
X – Bye
* – Golden point game
Opponent for round listed above margin

Ladder

Ladder progression
Numbers highlighted in green indicate that the team finished the round inside the top 8.
Numbers highlighted in blue indicates the team finished first on the ladder in that round.
Numbers highlighted in red indicates the team finished last place on the ladder in that round.
Underlined numbers indicate that the team had a bye during that round.

Finals series

A new format of extra time was introduced for the finals series where two additional 5-minute periods are played and if the scores are still tied afterwards, the next team to score wins.

The 2016 Finals series is notable as the first time three Queensland teams have all made the finals in one season.

Canberra also broke a long preliminary final drought reaching their first grand final qualifier in 19 years.
 

† Match decided in extra time.

Chart

Grand final

Regular season player statistics
The following statistics are at the conclusion of Round 26.

Top 5 point scorers

Top 5 try scorers

Top 5 goal scorers

Top 5 tacklers

Transfers

Players

Source:

Coaches

Attendances

Total and average home attendances:

References

External links
List of fixtures/times in date order at foxsports.com